The Valea Oii is a left tributary of the river Bahlueț in Romania. It flows into the Bahlueț in Sârca. The Sârca Reservoir is located on this river.

References

Rivers of Romania
Rivers of Iași County